Elise Demetria Neal (born March 14, 1966) is an American actress. In 1997, she made her big break appearing in three films, Rosewood, Money Talks and Scream 2.

From 1998 to 2002, Neal starred as Yvonne Hughley in the ABC/UPN sitcom The Hughleys. Other film appearances include Mission to Mars (2000), Hustle & Flow (2005) and Logan  (2017).  On television, Neal also starred as Tia Jewel in the first two seasons of the UPN/The CW sitcom All of Us from 2003 to 2005. She is a three-time NAACP Image Award nominee.

Early life
Neal was born on March 14, 1966, in Memphis, Tennessee, the daughter of a nurse and a construction worker. She attended Lakeview Elementary. She was a ballet dancer and a cheerleader. She broke her left wrist in a high toss cheerleading stunt; after the bones healed, her wrist never straightened back out completely. She graduated from Overton High School for the Creative and Performing Arts. 

From 1984 to 1988, she  attended the University of the Arts in Philadelphia. Elise left college after two years and moved to New York City where she landed roles in musical theater and found herself traveling the world with various touring companies. Her experience in musical theater allowed her to easily transition into commercials, eventually bringing her to Los Angeles. Neal was a member of the Tennessee Ballet Company.

Career
Neal was an accomplished dancer and appeared in several hip hop and R&B music videos in the early 1990s. One of her earliest jobs was as a background dancer in Chubb Rock's music video for "Just the Two of Us." Other music videos Neal has appeared in include Black Sheep's 1992 video for Strobelite Honey, Father MC's 1991 video for "Lisa Baby", Aretha Franklin's 1998 video for "A Rose Is Still a Rose", Trick Daddy's 2001 video "I'm a Thug", and Vanessa Williams' video "Work to Do". Neal was featured in the November 2007 edition of King Magazine. Neal also appeared as a backing dancer in the music video for Dannii Minogue's 1993 single "This Is It".

Neal made her film debut in Spike Lee's Malcolm X (1992). She landed the role of Janice Sinclair on the soap opera Loving. She then played fighter pilot J.J. Fredericks on the series seaQuest 2032. Neal was cast in the high-profile role of Hallie in Scream 2. Her character was originally written to be one of the killers of the movie, but due to a script leak her role was changed. She portrayed school teacher Scrappie in Rosewood.

Her breakout role was being cast as Yvonne Hughley, the wife of D.L. Hughley in the television sitcom The Hughleys (1998−2002). She received two NAACP Image Award nominations for Outstanding Actress in a Comedy Series for her role in the series. Following The Hughleys, Neal portrayed Kindergarten teacher Tia Jewel in All of Us. She left the series in 2005.

She has made guest appearances on Law & Order, Hangin' with Mr. Cooper, and Method & Red. Other film credits include: Paid in Full, Money Talks, and Mission to Mars. In Restaurant, she played Jeanine, a waitress who aspires to be a singer. Neal acted in a 2001 remake of Brian's Song as the wife of Gale Sayers. 

Neal received her third NAACP Image Award nomination in 2006, in the category of Outstanding Supporting Actress in a Motion Picture for the film Hustle & Flow as Yevette, the wife of Anthony Anderson's character.   Her role in the 2007 film 4 Life also marked her first soundtrack single, "I'm Down Baby". She also appeared in the series K-Ville as Ayana Boulet.

Expanding her role as producer, Neal is creating and developing several multimedia projects: a reality show based on her R&B group, "Assorted Flavors", a fitness and lifestyle brand, and several feature projects through her development deal with Mandalay Bay Entertainment. She appeared on reality show Hollywood Divas.

She played Alana in Love Ranch (2010). Neal guest starred on an episode of The Soul Man. She portrayed singer Gladys Knight in biopic Aaliyah: The Princess of R&B (2014). In a negative review of the film, Jon Caramanica opined Neal was the best actor in the production. Neal played Kathryn Munson in the 2017 superhero film Logan and appeared on television series Into the Dark.

Filmography

Film

Television

Documentary

Awards and nominations

References

External links
  
 

1966 births
American musical theatre actresses
Living people
Actresses from Memphis, Tennessee
American film actresses
American television actresses
African-American actresses
20th-century American actresses
21st-century American actresses
20th-century African-American women singers
21st-century African-American women
21st-century African-American people